is an original anime television series produced by Yoshitaka Amano, directed by Masahiko Komino at studios Lunch BOX and Studio Elle and written by Ryō Aoki. The series aired from July 15 to September 30, 2020. A special PR program aired on July 8, 2020.

Plot
In 2030, Japan, a virus known as "Gibia" has infected humans throughout the world and turns them into different forms of monsters based on their age, sex, and race. A samurai, a ninja and a monk from the early Edo period travel through time and arrive in a ruined Japan. They aid a professor working on a cure for the virus and face ceaseless attacks from Gibias. They start the dangerous journey to find other survivors and must not only deal with monsters, but also outlaws that attack travelers for food.

Characters

An exiled samurai transported forward in time to post-apocalyptic Tokyo. He was involved in the second Japanese invasion of Korea where he became known as the Slayer of Thousands while using a two sword style, with his katana, Suigetsumaru, and western sword, Halbert. He returned from the inconclusive invasion to relative obscurity, and served Jouzen Matsumoto. Matsumoto was indecisive during the Battle of Sekigahara where he made poor decisions, causing his downfall. This was when Sensui first encountered Kenroku from the Western Army, who challenged Sensui to a duel, but as they were evenly matched, Kenroku withdrew.

An exiled shinobi from the past who is transported forward in time to post-apocalyptic Tokyo with Sensui Kanzaki. He proclaims that he is a relative of Yukimura and Masayuki Sanada.

A huge warrior monk from Honganji, the main base of warrior monks known as Ishiyama Honganji who fought against Oda Nobunaga in the past. He is also transported forward in time to post-apocalyptic Tokyo. He has the word "evil" tattooed on his forehead and wields a spiked club called Douzan.

A young scientist who is working with her mother to find a cure for the Gibia virus. It is later revealed that she unwittingly caused Sensui, Kenroku and Yukinojyo to be brought from the past when she wished wish for strong men to help humanity as she saw three flaming comets falling to Earth. The comets were in fact flaming pieces broken from Yoshinaga's spaceship and the ship's matter acted on her brainwaves, turning her wish into reality.

A doctor working on a cure for the Gibia virus, but also coincidentally its cause on Earth. It is revealed that he and the Meteora were from another planet. If people there drank the blood of the god, Soma, they would gain special powers, but those who were incompatible would become monsters. He had been working on an artificial version, when his fiancee, Meteora, accidentally drank some and became a monster. When chaos enveloped the planet, he left with Meteora and the failed blood samples in a cryogenic capsule, to create a vaccine to save her. However, the ship broke up on approach to Earth and the capsule, with Meteora and the samples fell to Earth first, causing the Gibia outbreak. 

Kathleen's mother and a doctor.

 A former policewoman who joins Kathleen's group. Her preferred weapons are a pair of tonfa. She is seeking to arrest her father, a former criminal who escaped from prison. Ayame had to kill her own mother before she transformed into a monster after she was wounded by a Gibia.

The former head of small group of yakuza and Ayame's father. He survived the Gibia pandemic by being locked up in jail and escaped when the jail was attacked by Gibia. He leads a small band of former convicts calling themselves the Gallients.

He is second in command of the Gallients. He has been with Renjiro since the yakuza era. His weapon is a two-handed pistol.

A member of the Gallients who was in prison for murder. He is a former Olympic pole vaulter and specializes in attacks utilizing his skill with a spear.

A member of the Gallients and a former prisoner.

An overweight member of the Gallients and a former prisoner.

Production and release
During Anime Expo 2019, Gibiate Project revealed that they are producing an original anime television series. Ryō Aoki is writing and planning the project, as well as serving as its executive producer. Masahiko Komino will serve as director, animation character designer - directly adapting Yoshitaka Amano's original character designs into animation, as well as serving as chief animation director. Lunch BOX and Studio Elle will be in charge of animation production. Naoki Serizawa is designing the monsters. Yuzo Koshiro is composing the series' music. Other artists such as Japanese doll maker Mataro Kanabayashi the Third, bladesmith Kunihisa Kunihisa, calligrapher and artist Sisyu, and Hideo Komatsu the president of the shamisen company Komatsuya Co., Ltd. are also listed as collaborators. Sugizo performed the opening theme song "Gibiate" with the Yoshida Brothers and the ending theme "Endless" with Maki Ohguro. The Chinese version of the ending theme was covered by VOGUE5. It was set to premiere at Anime Expo 2020 but was cancelled on account of the COVID-19 pandemic. The series aired from July 15 to September 30, 2020 on Tokyo MX, AT-X, and BS Fuji. Crunchyroll streamed the series as a Crunchyroll Original anime in North America, Central America, South America, Europe, Africa, Oceania, and the Middle East. In Southeast Asia, the series is licensed by Medialink and released on Ani-One YouTube channel, as well as on the streaming service iQIYI.

Reception
The reception was largely unfavorable, with most of the criticism aimed towards the weak CGI.

References

External links
Anime official website 

2020 anime television series debuts
Anime with original screenplays
Action anime and manga
Fantasy anime and manga
Crunchyroll Originals
Yakuza in anime and manga
Medialink